Ralph E. Koch Airport  is a public use airport in Gibson County, Indiana, United States. It is located two nautical miles (4 km) north of the central business district of Poseyville, a town in Posey County.

Facilities and aircraft 
Ralph E. Koch Airport covers an area of 81 acres (33 ha) at an elevation of 450 feet (137 m) above mean sea level. It has two runways with turf surfaces: 4/22 is 2,960 by 100 feet (902 x 30 m) and 18U/36U is 1,125 by 100 feet (343 x 30 m).

For the 12-month period ending December 31, 2006, the airport had 840 general aviation aircraft operations, an average of 70 per month. At that time there were two aircraft based at this airport,
one single-engine and one ultralight.

See also 
 List of airports in Indiana

References

External links 
 
 Aerial image as of April 1998 from USGS The National Map
 Aeronautical chart at SkyVector

Airports in Indiana
Transportation in Gibson County, Indiana
Buildings and structures in Gibson County, Indiana